Noël Armand Fiessinger (24 December 1881 – 15 January 1946) was a French physician.

External links
 

1881 births
1946 deaths
20th-century French physicians